An okres (in English district) is an administrative unit in Slovakia. It is a second-tier territorial administrative unit, below a Region in standing, and superior to a municipality. Each district contains at least several municipalities. 

The cities of Bratislava and Košice are the only cities in Slovakia divided into internal urban districts, with five in Bratislava, and four in Košice. These urban districts are then further divided into smaller boroughs (which serve a function analogous to municipalities in typical districts).

All other districts are larger in size and also include rural areas, and rural as well as urban municipalities. Each of these more typical districts has an urban centre serving as the seat of the district, usually the largest town (or the only town) of a given district. Rural municipalities are not legally allowed to become district seats.

Map of current Slovak districts

Characteristics
Several districts form a "Region" (Slovak "kraj"). One district, on the other hand, consists of several "municipalities" (Slovak "obec"), which in turn consist of "cadastral areas" (Slovak "katastrálne územie"). 

Districts have been units of state administration in Slovakia since its creation with a few interruptions, e. g. except for the period from 2004 to late 2013. Today, each district is administered by a "district office" (okresný úrad). Since late 2013, there have been also some special district offices being responsible (regarding some selected issues) not for the territory of a district, but for the territory of a Region (kraj) - they are called "district office at the seat of a Region" (okresný úrad v sídle kraja). 

In the period from 2004 to late 2013, the district offices were abolished and replaced by "circuit offices" (obvodný úrad), which were usually responsible for several districts (except for the Nové Zámky District, which was one district with two circuit offices).

Slovakia has currently 79 districts, the capital of Bratislava being divided into 5 districts and the city of Košice in 4 districts. The districts are named after the biggest town in the district (formerly known as the "district towns").

For history see: Okres

Districts of Slovakia
The following table gives an overview of the districts, along with the population, area, and location within Slovakia.

See also
Boroughs and localities of Bratislava
Boroughs and localities of Košice

References

External links

 Urban and municipal statistics

 
Subdivisions of Slovakia
Slovakia, Districts
Slovakia 2
Districts, Slovakia
Slovakia geography-related lists